The 1990 Coupe de France Final was a football match held at Parc des Princes, Paris on 2 June 1990, that saw Montpellier HSC defeat RC Paris 2–1 in extra time, thanks to goals by Laurent Blanc and Kader Ferhaoui.

Match details

See also
1989–90 Coupe de France

External links
Coupe de France results at Rec.Sport.Soccer Statistics Foundation
Report on French federation site
Report in the L'HUMANITÉ (Monday, 4 June, 1990)

Coupe
1990
Coupe De France Final 1990
Coupe De France Final 1990
Coupe de France Final
Coupe de France Final